Elizabeth Cook-Lynn (born "Elizabeth Irving", Crow Creek Sioux, in 1930) is an editor, essayist, poet, and novelist. She is considered to be outspoken in her views about Native American politics, particularly in regards to tribal sovereignty.

She has criticized those who make tenuous claims to Native/Indigenous ancestry with the purpose of advancing their own careers, and described such claimants with no community connections as "tribeless". She believes they damage the development of economic and social life of Native nations.[1]

Biography 
Cook-Lynn was born in Fort Thompson, South Dakota on the Crow Creek Reservation. She is a Dakota and member of the Crow Creek Sioux Tribe. There, she attended school on the Big Bend Reservation. She was raised in a family of scholars and politicians, with both her father and grandfather serving on the Crow Creek Sioux Tribal Council. Her grandmother wrote in English and Dakota for Christian newspapers. Her great-grandfather, Gabriel Renville, was a Native linguist and pioneer of early Dakota-language dictionaries.

Cook-Lynn attended South Dakota State College (which later became South Dakota State University) where she earned a BA in English and Journalism. In college, she took a history class about westward expansion and was surprised that it ignored the Native American presence in the region. This sparked her interest in advocating for Native Americans. Cook-Lynn states that she began to write out of anger, as an "act of defiance born of the need to survive ... as Simon Ortiz says, it is an act that defies oppression."

Cook-Lynn did graduate studies at New Mexico State University in 1966, Black Hills State College in 1968, and finished her doctorate program at the University of Nebraska in 1978. Prior to receiving her doctorate, Cook-Lynn was selected as a National Endowment for the Humanities fellow and studied in 1976 at Stanford University.

In 1985 Cook-Lynn co-founded Wíčazo Ša Review ("Red Pencil"), an academic journal devoted to Native American studies as an academic discipline. The other founding editors were Beatrice Medicine, Roger Buffalohead, and William Willard. Cook-Lynn has both written and taught in her academic career.

She taught at multiple high schools in New Mexico and South Dakota, and has been a visiting professor at University of California Davis. Most notably, Cook-Lynn served as a professor of English and Native Studies at Eastern Washington University. She retired from this position in 1971, and became Professor Emerita in 1990. She has also served as a writer-in-residence at multiple universities, and was a visiting professor at Arizona State University in 2000.

In her book, You May Consider Speaking About Your Art, Cook-Lynn states that the contemporary poet is someone who must "consecrate history and event, survival and joy and sorrow, the significance of ancestors and the unborn." Her first book, Then Badger Said This (1977) "illustrated multi-genre exploration of the sources of Dakotah life and values." She acknowledges writer N. Scott Momaday in the creation of the book.

Cook-Lynn has opposed the presidency of Donald Trump and the governorship of Kristi Noem, accusing the SDGOP of holding a "regime" over the state and restricting peoples rights in terms of assembly, speech, and access to abortion procedures. She continued to criticize Noem even after the governor declared Sioux the official indigenous language / co-official language of the state. Cook-Lynn has said that certain tribes with more cordial relations with the Federal Government, such as those in Oklahoma, Montana and Idaho, are "Vichy Indians," referring to Occupied France during World War II and the words of Oglala Lakota activist Russell Means.

Awards 
 2007 Lifetime Achievement Award by the Native Writers' Circle of the Americas
 National Endowment for the Humanities fellowship
 2002 Literary Contribution Award from the Mountain Plains Library Association
 Oyate Igluwitaya by the Native American Club at South Dakota State University
 Why I Can't Read Wallace Stegner and Other Essays : A Tribal Voice, cited for a Gustavus Myers Award

Bibliography

From the river's edge (NY: Arcade, 1991).
At Dawn, Sitting in My Father's House

Poetry
I remember the fallen trees : new and selected poems (Cheney, WA: Eastern Washington University Press, 1998).

Short stories
The power of horses and other stories (NY: Arcade, 1990).
Seek the house of relatives (Marvin, SD: Blue Cloud Quarterly Press, 1983).
Then Badger said this (Fairfield, WA: Ye Galleon Press, 1983).

Non-fiction
A Separate Country: Postcoloniality and American Indian Nations (Texas Tech University Press, 2011).
Anti-Indianism in Modern America: A Voice from Tatekeya's Earth (Illinois UP 2001).
Politics of Hallowed Ground : Wounded Knee and the Struggle for Indian Sovereignty (with Mario Gonzalez) (Illinois UP, 1999).
Why I can't read Wallace Stegner and other essays : a tribal voice (Madison : University of Wisconsin Press, 1996).

See also

List of writers from peoples indigenous to the Americas
Native American Renaissance
Native American Studies

References

Further reading

External links
Official ECL website

1930 births
Living people
20th-century American novelists
20th-century American poets
20th-century American short story writers
20th-century American women writers
American women novelists
American women poets
American women short story writers
Eastern Washington University faculty
Native American academics
Native American women academics
American women academics
Native American activists
Native American novelists
Native American poets
Native American women writers
Novelists from South Dakota
Novelists from Washington (state)
Dakota people
People from Buffalo County, South Dakota
People from Rapid City, South Dakota
21st-century American women
20th-century Native American women
20th-century Native Americans
21st-century Native American women
21st-century Native Americans